Valerie Ritchie Perrine (born September 3, 1943) is an  American actress. For her role as Honey Bruce in the 1974 film Lenny, she won the BAFTA Award for Most Promising Newcomer to Leading Film Roles, the Cannes Film Festival Award for Best Actress, and was nominated for the Academy Award for Best Actress. Her other film appearances include Superman (1978),  The Electric Horseman (1979), and Superman II (1980).

Early life
Perrine was born in Galveston, Texas, as the daughter of Winifred "Renee" (nee McGinley), a dancer who appeared in Earl Carroll's Vanities, and Kenneth I. Perrine, a lieutenant colonel in the U.S. Army. Kenneth I. Perrine was the grandson of Alfred Perrine of Wallkill, N.Y., a descendant of Staten Island Huguenot Daniel Perrin. The Perrine family dates its ancestry to the French family of Perrin, which intermarried with other Normans dating back to William the Conqueror in 1066. Her mother was Scottish (of Irish descent), from Helensburgh in Dunbartonshire.

Owing to her father's career, Perrine lived in many locations as the family moved to different posts.

Career
She played soft-core pornography actress Montana Wildhack in the film adaptation of Kurt Vonnegut's Slaughterhouse-Five (1972). Perrine was photographed nude for a pictorial layout in the May 1972 issue of Playboy, later appearing on the cover in August 1981. She then became the first actress to appear nude on American television by exposing her breasts during the May 4, 1973, PBS broadcast of Bruce Jay Friedman's Steambath on Hollywood Television Theater. Only a few PBS stations nationwide carried the program. Later in 1973, she appeared in the episode "When the Girls Came Out to Play" of the romantic anthology television series Love Story (1973).

In 1975, Perrine was nominated for the Academy Award for Best Actress and the Golden Globe for Best Motion Picture Actress (Drama) and won the Best Actress Award at the Cannes Film Festival for her role as comedian Lenny Bruce's wife, stripper Honey Bruce, in Bob Fosse's Lenny (1974).

She portrayed Carlotta Monti, mistress of W.C. Fields, in the biopic W.C. Fields and Me (1976). She played Miss Eve Teschmacher, moll of criminal mastermind Lex Luthor, in Superman (1978). For this role, she was nominated for the 1979 Saturn Award for Best Supporting Actress. She reprised her role as Miss Teschmacher in Superman II (1980).

Perrine played Charlotta Steele, ex-wife of a rodeo champion played by Robert Redford, in The Electric Horseman (1979). Her career grew uneven after an appearance in Can't Stop the Music (1980), for which she was nominated for a Razzie Award for Worst Actress. This film has since become a cult classic. In 1982, she played the role of Marcy, the wife of a corrupt police officer, in The Border with Jack Nicholson. In 1986, she starred in the failed CBS comedy series Leo & Liz in Beverly Hills with Harvey Korman.

In the years since then, Perrine has worked in lower-profile projects, although she did have a small supporting role in the 2000 Mel Gibson film What Women Want. In 1995, Perrine made a guest appearance on the series Homicide: Life on the Street, playing an ex-wife of Richard Belzer's character, Detective John Munch.

Stacey Souther directed and produced Valerie, a documentary about Perrine's career and her experience with Parkinson's disease. Valerie was screened at the Edmonton Film Festival in 2020.

Personal life

Health
Perrine was diagnosed with Parkinson's disease in 2015 and underwent dental surgery in 2017 to restore her teeth after they became damaged due to the medications she had been taking for her illness.

Filmography

Film

Television

Awards and nominations

References

External links 

 

1943 births
20th-century American actresses
21st-century American actresses
Living people
Actresses from Texas
American female models
American film actresses
American television actresses
BAFTA Most Promising Newcomer to Leading Film Roles winners
Cannes Film Festival Award for Best Actress winners
People from Galveston, Texas
People with Parkinson's disease